Gudrun Ritter (born 16 November 1936) is a German actress. She appeared in more than one hundred films since 1959.

Selected filmography

References

External links 

1936 births
Living people
German film actresses